This page lists the World Best Year Performances in the year 1991 in the hammer throw for both men and women. One of the main events during this season were the World Championships in Tokyo, Japan, where the final of the men's competition was held  on Sunday August 25, 1991.

Men

Records

1991 World Year Ranking

Women

1991 World Year Ranking

References
digilander.libero
apulanta
hammerthrow.wz

1991
Hammer Throw Year Ranking, 1991